Yasuhiro Funatogawa (born 15 April 1955) is a Japanese professional golfer.

Funatogawa played on the Japan Golf Tour, winning four times.

Professional wins (4)

Japan Golf Tour wins (4)

*Note: The 1980 Nihon Kokudo Keikaku Summers was shortened to 54 holes due to rain.

Japan Golf Tour playoff record (1–1)

Results in major championships

CUT = missed the half-way cut
Note: Funatogawa only played in The Open Championship.

External links

Japanese male golfers
Japan Golf Tour golfers
Sportspeople from Saitama Prefecture
1955 births
Living people